Twin Peaks is an American television serial drama, created by David Lynch and Mark Frost, that aired on the ABC network from April 8, 1990 to June 10, 1991. The series centers on the investigation into the murder of schoolgirl Laura Palmer in the small rural town in Washington state after which the series is named.

Since the broadcast of the pilot episode, Twin Peaks earned widespread critical acclaim. The first season earned thirteen Emmy Award nominations—of which it won two awards—a Directors Guild of America Award nomination, and won a Casting Society of America Award, two Golden Globe Awards and two Grammy Awards.

Lead actor Kyle MacLachlan was twice nominated for an Emmy Award for Outstanding Lead Actor in a Drama Series and won the Golden Globe Award for Best Actor in a Television Series Drama. Piper Laurie, who was nominated for two Emmy Awards—Outstanding Lead Actress in a Drama Series in 1990 and Outstanding Supporting Actress in a Drama Series in 1991—, won the Golden Globe Award for Best Supporting Actress in a Series, Miniseries or Television Film in 1990.

Brit Awards

|-
|1991
|Twin Peaks
|Soundtrack/Cast Recording
|
|}

Casting Society of America Awards

Directors Guild of America Awards

Emmy Awards
Awarded since 1949, the Primetime Emmy Award is an annual accolade bestowed by members of the Academy of Television Arts & Sciences recognizing outstanding achievements in American prime time television programming.  Awards presented for more technical and production-based categories (like art direction, casting, and editing) are designated "Creative Arts Emmy Awards."  Twin Peaks has been nominated for a total of twenty-seven awards and won two.

Primetime Emmy Awards

Primetime Creative Arts Emmy Awards

Golden Globe Awards

Golden Reel Awards

Grammy Awards

Satellite Awards

Saturn Awards

TCA Awards

Viewers for Quality Television Awards

References

Awards
Twin Peaks
Emmy Award-winning programs